Windsor Lake is a provincial electoral district in Newfoundland and Labrador. As of 2011 there are 14,187 people living in the district. Windsor Lake includes part of the city of St. John's suburban east end, covering the neighbourhoods of Clovelly Trails, Anne Jeannette, Airport Heights, Ricketts Bridge, Spruce Meadows, Kents Pond, Bells Turn and Little Canada.

The district was created following the 2015 electoral districts boundaries review. The district includes parts of the former districts of Cape St. Francis, Conception Bay East-Bell Island, St. John's East, St. John's North, and  Virginia Waters.

Members of the House of Assembly
The district has elected the following Members of the House of Assembly:

Election results

}
|-

|}

References

Newfoundland and Labrador provincial electoral districts
Politics of St. John's, Newfoundland and Labrador